Environmental warfare is waging warfare by means of deliberate environmental destruction or alteration.

See also
Ecocide
Environmental Modification Convention

Sources

Military tactics
Environmental controversies